Mount Alexander is a mountain north-west of Melbourne, Australia. It may also refer to:

 Mount Alexander (Antarctica)
 Mount Alexander Road, Melbourne, Australia
 Shire of Mount Alexander, Victoria, Australia
 Earl of Mount Alexander, an extinct title in the Peerage of Ireland